Prophet is an album by American jazz saxophonist Oliver Lake recorded in 1980 for the Italian Black Saint label. The album is a tribute to Eric Dolphy.

Reception
The Allmusic review by Al Campbell awarded the album 4 stars, calling it "a relatively straight-ahead date".

Track listing
All compositions by Oliver Lake except as indicated
 "Hat and Beard" (Eric Dolphy) - 7:00 
 "Something Sweet, Something Tender" (Dolphy) - 4:30 
 "Poster" - 6:25 
 "The Prophet" (Dolphy) - 7:05 
 "Cotton IV" - 7:40 
 "Firm and Ripe" - 6:45
Recorded at Sound Heights Studios in Brooklyn, New York on August 11 & 12, 1980

Personnel
Oliver Lake - alto saxophone
Baikida Carroll - trumpet, flugelhorn
Donald Smith - piano
Jerry Harris - bass
Pheeroan akLaff - drums

References

Black Saint/Soul Note albums
Oliver Lake albums
1980 albums